

Current squad

(on loan from Flamengo)

(on loan from Almería)

Transfers

In

Out

Statistics

Top scorers

Managers performance

Overview

Competitions

Campeonato Mineiro

Results Summary

Semi-finals

Finals

Copa Libertadores

Results Summary

Group stage

Knockout phase

Round of 16

Quarter-finals

Semi-finals

Finals

Campeonato Brasileiro

Results Summary

Matches

Copa do Brasil

Round of 16

FIFA Club World Cup

Semi-final

Third Place

References

External links
official website

Clube Atlético Mineiro seasons
Atletico Mineiro